Rafael Baledón Cárdenas (25 November 1919 – 6 May 1994) was a Mexican actor, director, screenwriter, and producer of the Golden Age of Mexican cinema. He worked in both film and television.

Life 
Rafael Baledón was on 25 November 1919 in Campeche, Mexico. He initially wanted to be a doctor, but could not pursue the career due to economic reasons. His acting career began working as an extra until he received his major acting job for the 1942 film María Eugenia. The following year, he married actress Lilia Michel and had five children: Rafael, Leonor, Ana Laura, Lourdes and Lilia.

On 6 May 1994, he died of a heart attack.

Selected filmography

Television

Actor

Director

Film
 The Count of Monte Cristo (1942)
 La  Fuerza Inútil (1972 film)

References

External links 
 

1919 births
1994 deaths
Mexican male film actors
Mexican male telenovela actors
Mexican film directors
Male actors from Campeche
People from Campeche City
20th-century Mexican male actors